George Yvon (February15, 1887November20, 1957) was a British diver who competed in the 1912 Summer Olympics. He was born in France, and died in Great Britain.

In 1912 he competed in both the men's 10 metre platform, in which he placed fifth, as well as the men's plain high events.

References

External links

1887 births
1957 deaths
British male divers
Olympic divers of Great Britain
Divers at the 1912 Summer Olympics